Antonio Piraíno (12 August 1928 – 6 May 2020) was a Chilean equestrian who competed in the 1968 Summer Olympics.

References

External links
 

1928 births
2020 deaths
Chilean male equestrians
Chilean dressage riders
Olympic equestrians of Chile
Equestrians at the 1968 Summer Olympics
Equestrians at the 1971 Pan American Games
Pan American Games silver medalists for Chile
Pan American Games bronze medalists for Chile
Pan American Games medalists in equestrian
Medalists at the 1971 Pan American Games
20th-century Chilean people
21st-century Chilean people